The Campeonato Brasileiro Série B 2007, namely the second division of the Brazilian League, was contested by 20 teams. The tournament started in May, and reached its end on November 24. The 20 teams played home and away matches among each other and, by the end of the year, the four best-ranked (Coritiba, Ipatinga, Portuguesa and Vitória) were promoted to the first division and the four worst-ranked (Paulista, Santa Cruz, Remo, Ituano) were relegated to the third division.

Standings

Matches 

2007 in Brazilian football leagues
Campeonato Brasileiro Série B seasons